The science fiction franchise Doctor Who has been referenced in various popular culture media. Some of these references have ranged from cameos, pastiches and by name or word. The series has also been parodied on many occasions.

Film

Television

Video games

Music

Literature

Comics

Web videos

See also
Doctor Who fandom
List of Doctor Who parodies
Doctor Who spin-offs
Doctor Who merchandise
Doctor Who exhibitions

References

Television shows in popular culture
Popular culture